Marikens bryllup (Mariken's Wedding) is a Norwegian comedy from 1972 directed by Knut Andersen with a script by Nicole Macé. Anne Marit Jacobsen plays the title role as Mariken, who marries Per Egil, played by Geir Børresen. The film is about the wedding and presents many family members and friends that come to the wedding.

Cast
 Anne Marit Jacobsen: Mariken
 Geir Børresen: Per Egil Monsen
 Eilif Armand: Birger Lyngmo, the father
 Gerd Jørgensen: Elise Lyngmo, the mother
 Tone Schwarzott: Synnøve
 Inge Fjeldstad: Arne
 Kari Diesen: Aunt Gerda
 Rolf Just Nilsen: Uncle Edvard
 Veslemøy Haslund: Margaret
 Siri Hølmebakk: Heidi
 Jack Fjeldstad: Leif, Per's father
 Per Tofte: Gunnar Sand
 Bjarne Andersen: the priest
 Arne Lie: Carsten
 Kari Simonsen: hairdresser
 Jo Fenstad: Roger
 Anne Karin Paaske: Tone
 Ole Fredrik Røøk: Svein Rune
 Vibeke Lundquist: Mona
 Espen Urbye: Morten
 Edel Eriksen
 Per Hagerup
 Tore Schistad
 Kåre Wicklund
 Kaare Zachariassen

References

External links 
 
 Nasjonalbiblioteket: Norsk filmografi: Marikens bryllup
 Filmweb.no: Marikens bryllup

Norwegian comedy films
Films directed by Knut Andersen
1970s Norwegian-language films
1972 films
1972 comedy films